IPRT may refer to:

 Independent Pricing and Regulatory Tribunal, an Australian regulatory agency
 Industrial platinum resistance thermometer
 Institute for Practical Research and Training, a Somali non-government organization
 Institute of Physical Research and Technology at Iowa State University
 Internationale Packet Radio Tagung, a German packet radio conference
 IPrint.com, NASAQ symbol IPRT
 Irish Penal Reform Trust, a group campaigning for change in prisons in Ireland